James Edward McBryde (born September 23, 1950) was an American businessman and politician.

McBryde was born in Santa Monica, California and graduated from Central Michigan University in 1972. He lived in Mount Pleasant, Isabella County, Michigan with his wife and family. McBryde was a sales representative. He served on the Isabella County Commission from 1985 to 1990 and was a Republican. McBryde then served in the Michigan House of Representatives from 1991 to 1998. He serves as the president and CEO of the Middle Michigan Development Corporation.

References

1950 births
Living people
People from Mount Pleasant, Michigan
People from Santa Monica, California
Central Michigan University alumni
Businesspeople from Michigan
County commissioners in Michigan
Republican Party members of the Michigan House of Representatives